Karl Schügerl (22 June 1927 – 20 October 2018) was a Hungarian-German chemical engineer. He was a member of the Hungarian Academy of Sciences. He also was awarded an honorary doctorate by the Budapest University. In 1992 vol. 46 of the Springer book series Advances in Biochemical Engineering/Biotechnology was dedicated to Karl Schügerl's 65-th birthday. Schügerl was awarded the DECHEMA Medal in 1997.

References

Sources 
 
 CV from the University page
 Detailed curriculum vitae (PDF): http://www.schuegerl-karl.homepage.t-online.de/Schuegerl-Lebenslauf.pdf

External links 
 

1927 births
2018 deaths
People from Sopron
Hungarian engineers
Hungarian chemical engineers